The voiced labial–velar approximant is a type of consonantal sound, used in certain spoken languages, including English. In most languages it is the semivocalic counterpart of the close back rounded vowel . In inventory charts of languages with other labialized velar consonants,  will be placed in the same column as those consonants. When consonant charts have only labial and velar columns,  may be placed in the velar column, (bi)labial column, or both. The placement may have more to do with phonological criteria than phonetic ones.

Some languages have a voiced labial–prevelar approximant, which is more fronted than the place of articulation of the prototypical voiced labialized velar approximant, though not as front as the prototypical labialized palatal approximant.

Features
Features of the voiced labial–velar approximant:

  The type of approximant is glide or semivowel. The term semivowel emphasizes that, although the sound is vocalic in nature, it is not 'syllabic' (it does not form the nucleus of a syllable).
 Some languages, such as Japanese and perhaps the Northern Iroquoian languages, have a sound typically transcribed as  where the lips are compressed (or at least not rounded), which is a true labial–velar (as opposed to labialized velar) consonant. Close transcriptions may avoid the symbol  in such cases, or may use the under-rounding diacritic, .

Occurrence

See also
 Voiceless labial–velar approximant
 Nasal labial–velar approximant

Notes

References

External links
 

Labial–velar consonants
Voiced oral consonants
Central consonants
Pulmonic consonants